Zentsov is a Russian masculine surname, its feminine counterpart is Zentsova. Notable people with the surname include:

Roman Zentsov (born 1973), Russian mixed martial arts artist
Valeri Zentsov (born 1946), Russian spy
 

Russian-language surnames